Casa Bonet is a house in Barcelona, Spain, located on the Passeig de Gràcia in the Eixample district. Originally built in 1887, it was remodelled in an eclectic Neo-Baroque style by Marcel·lí Coquillat in 1915. The house forms part of a row of buildings known as the Illa de la Discòrdia (or Mansana de la Discòrdia, the "Block of Discord").

The Illa de la Discòrdia derives its name from its clashing architectural styles, and while the block is best known for its Modernista architecture (most notably Antoni Gaudí's Casa Batlló of 1906), the more conservative classical style of Casa Bonet contrasts sharply with its more opulent neighbours.

History
Casa Bonet was built in 1887 by Jaume Brossa and was known as the Casa Torruella. In 1915, Delfina Bonet commissioned the architect  Marcel·lí Coquillat to redesign the facade, remodelling it in an Italianate Neo-Baroque style with a two-storey loggia and neo-baroque ornamental details decorating the upper floor lintels.

Today the building is occupied by the Barcelona Perfume Museum.

References

External links

 
 

Neoclassical architecture in Barcelona
Modernisme architecture in Barcelona
Houses completed in 1887
Houses completed in 1915
Tourist attractions in Barcelona
Eixample
Passeig de Gràcia
Houses in Catalonia
Bien de Interés Cultural landmarks in the Province of Barcelona